Levitation is a 1997 film directed and produced by Scott D. Goldstein. The motion picture stars Sarah Paulson, Ernie Hudson, and Benjamin Heflin.

Plot
Sarah Paulson portrays Acey Rawlin, a teenage girl who gets pregnant after spending the night with a man she just met. Acey's only friend, a fisherman named Bob, may be imaginary. And when Acey tells her mother Anna about her problems, Anna chooses this moment to tell Acey that she's adopted, which causes her to search out her birth mother.

Cast
Sarah Paulson as Acey Rawlin 
Ernie Hudson as Downbeat 
Jeremy London as Bob 
Ann Magnuson as Anna Rawlin/Sara Fulton 
Christopher Boyer as Acey's Father
Grand L. Bush as Toby Banks
Antonio Fargas as Otis Hill
Brett Cullen as James
Stephanie Hawkins as Elizabeth Fulton
Jim Kamm as Peter Fulton
Karen Witter as Ranch Woman

Crew
Lauren M. Gabor - Production Designer
Scott D. Goldstein - Director, Editor, Producer, Screenwriter
Leonard Rosenman - Composer (Music Score)
Fred M. Wardell - Editor
William Fiege - Sound/Sound Designer
Shelly Strong - Producer
Julie Ashton-Barson - Casting
Brian Bettwy - First Assistant Director
Abigail Mannox - Art Director
Michael Wojciechowski - Cinematographer

Company Information
Strong Productions - Production Company
Tenth Muse Productions - Production Company
Northern Arts Entertainment Inc - Domestic Theatrical Distributor

References

External links

1997 films
1997 independent films
American independent films
Films scored by Leonard Rosenman
Teenage pregnancy in film
1990s English-language films
1990s American films